Nik Jurišić (born 6 July 1988) is Croatian rugby union player of HARK Mladost and national captain player.

References

External links
Hrvatski Ragbijaški Savez Profile
rugbyworldcup2019 profile
RCC profile

1988 births
Living people
Croatian rugby union players